Olympia is a 1938 German sports film written, directed and produced by Leni Riefenstahl, which documented the 1936 Summer Olympics, held in the Olympic Stadium in Berlin during the Nazi period. The film was released in two parts: Olympia 1. Teil — Fest der Völker (Festival of Nations) (126 minutes) and Olympia 2. Teil — Fest der Schönheit (Festival of Beauty) (100 minutes). The first documentary about the Olympics made, Olympia set the precedent for future cinematic documents, glorifying the Olympics, particularly the Summer Games. The 1936 Summer Olympics torch relay was devised for the Games by the secretary general of the Organizing Committee, Dr. Carl Diem. Riefenstahl staged the torch relay for the film, with competitive events of the Games.

Many advanced motion picture techniques, which later became industry standards but which were groundbreaking at the time, were employed, including unusual camera angles, smash cuts, extreme close-ups and placing tracking shot rails within the bleachers. Although restricted to six camera positions on the stadium field, Riefenstahl set up cameras in as many other places as she could, including in the grandstands. She attached automatic cameras to balloons, including instructions to return the film to her, and she also placed automatic cameras in boats during practice runs. Amateur photography was used to supplement that of the professionals along the course of races. Perhaps the greatest innovation seen in Olympia was the use of an underwater camera. The camera followed divers through the air and, as soon as they hit the water, the cameraman dived down with them, all the while changing focus and aperture.

While the craft employed are almost universally admired, Olympia is controversial due to its political context and propaganda value. Nevertheless, it appears on many lists of the greatest films of all time, including Time magazine's "All-Time 100 Movies."

Versions 

Olympia was made in three language versions: German, French and English.  There are slight differences between each one, including which portions were included and their sequence within the film. The French version is known by the alternate title Les Dieux du Stade (Gods of the Stadium).

It seems to have been Riefenstahl's habit to re-edit the film upon re-release, so that there are multiple versions of each language version of the film. For example, as originally released, the famous diving sequence (the penultimate sequence of the entire film) ran about four minutes. Riefenstahl subsequently reduced it by about 50 seconds. (The entire sequence can be seen in prints of the film circulated by the collector Raymond Rohauer.)

Reception 

The reaction to the film in Germany was enthusiastic, and it was received with acclaim and accolades around the world. In 1960, Riefenstahl's peers voted Olympia one of the 10 best films of all time. The Daily Telegraph recognised the film as "even more technically dazzling" than Triumph of the Will. The Times described the film as "visually ravishing ... A number of sequences in the supposedly documentary Olympia, notably that devoted to the high-diving competition, become less and less concerned with record and more and more abstract: as some of the divers hit the water, the visual interest of patterns of movement takes over."

American film critic Richard Corliss observed in Time that "the matter of Riefenstahl 'the Nazi director' is worth raising so it can be dismissed. [I]n the hallucinatory documentary Triumph of the Will ... [she] painted Adolf Hitler as a Wagnerian deity ... But that was in 1934–35. In [Olympia] Riefenstahl gave the same heroic treatment to Jesse Owens."

The film won a number of prestigious film awards but fell from grace, particularly in the United States when, in November 1938, the world learned of Kristallnacht, an especially violent pogrom against the Jews of Germany. Riefenstahl was touring the U.S. to promote the film at that time and was immediately asked to leave the country.

Awards 

The film won several awards;

 National Film Prize (1937–1938)
 Venice International Film Festival (1938) — Coppa Mussolini (Best Film)
 Greek Sports Prize (1938)
 Olympic Gold Medal from the International Olympic Committee (1939)
 Lausanne International Film Festival (1948) — Olympic Diploma

Re-release 

There had been few screenings of Olympia in English-speaking countries upon its original release; the film was not shown in the United States until 1940, and was then re-released in 1948 under the title Kings of the Olympics in a truncated version acquired from Germany by the U.S. Office of Alien Property Custodian and severely edited without Riefenstahl's involvement. In 1955 Riefenstahl agreed to remove three minutes of Hitler footage for screening at the Museum of Modern Art in New York City. The same version was also screened on West German television and in cinemas around the world.

In popular culture 

 In the 2016 biographical film about Jesse Owens, Race, the filming at the Olympic Games is depicted with Riefenstahl constantly quarreling with Goebbels about her artistic decisions, especially over filming Jesse Owens, who is proving a politically embarrassing refutation of Nazi Germany's claims about Aryan athletic supremacy.
 Neue Deutsche Härte band Rammstein released a cover of Depeche Mode's song "Stripped" in 1998. The song's music video is made from footage from Olympia.

References

Further reading 

 Rossol, Nadine. "Performing the Nation: Sports, Spectacles, and Aesthetics in Germany, 1926-1936," Central European History Dec 2010, Vol. 43 Issue 4, pp 616–638
 McFee, Graham and Alan Tomlinson. "Riefenstahl's 'Olympia:' Ideology and Aesthetics in the Shaping of the Aryan Athletic Body," International Journal of the History of Sport, Feb 1999, Vol. 16 Issue 2, pp 86–106
 Mackenzie, Michael, “From Athens to Berlin: The 1936 Olympics and Leni Riefenstahl’s Olympia,” in: Critical Inquiry, Vol. 29 (Winter 2003)
 Rippon, Anton. Hitler's Olympics: The Story of the 1936 Nazi Games 2006

External links 

 
 
 Olympia 1. Teil – Fest der Völker on Internet Archive
 Olympia 2. Teil – Fest der Schönheit on Internet Archive
 

1938 documentary films
1938 films
Documentary films about Berlin
Nazi propaganda films
1930s German-language films
Black-and-white documentary films
Films of Nazi Germany
Films about the 1936 Summer Olympics
Films set in Germany
Films set in Berlin
Films directed by Leni Riefenstahl
Documentary films about the Olympics
German documentary films
German black-and-white films
German sports films
1930s sports films
Films released in separate parts
1930s German films